Cyril V. Jackson (5 December 1903 – February 1988) was a South African astronomer, known for discovering 72 asteroids and a number of comets.

He was  born in Ossett, Yorkshire in England; his father emigrated to South Africa in 1911. He earned his B.Sc. at the University of the Witwatersrand.

He worked at Union Observatory in Johannesburg from 1928 to 1947 (IAU code 078, previously known as Transvaal Observatory and later known as Republic Observatory).

He served with South African forces in the Second World War, and was mentioned in despatches.

After the war he was director of the Yale-Columbia Southern Observatory (YCSO) station in Johannesburg (IAU code 077), which had been established by Yale University in the 1920s. Columbia University subsequently collaborated in that venture and the operation became known as the Yale-Columbia Southern Observatory (YCSO, Inc. was formally created in 1962).

Due to light pollution that observatory had to be shut down in 1951 and he supervised the move of its instrument, a 26-inch refracting telescope, to Mount Stromlo Observatory in Australia (IAU code 414). This Yale-Columbia telescope was given to the Australian National University in July 1963, and was destroyed in the 18 January 2003 firestorm that devastated Mount Stromlo.

Jackson worked at Mount Stromlo from 1957 to 1963. In 1963, Yale reopened its Columbia Southern Observatory at El Leoncito, Argentina (IAU code 808), and he served as its director there until 1966, when he retired. He discovered a number of comets, including the periodic comets 47P/Ashbrook-Jackson and 58P/Jackson-Neujmin. He also discovered 72 asteroids in the earlier part of his career at Union Observatory.

References

External links 
 JACKSON, Cyril
 

1903 births
1988 deaths
British emigrants to South Africa
South African astronomers
Discoverers of asteroids
People from Ossett
White South African people